Le signorine dello 04 (The ladies of the 04) is a 1955 Italian romantic comedy-drama film directed by Gianni Franciolini.

Cast 

Antonella Lualdi: Maria Teresa Landolfi
Antonio Cifariello: Amleto
Giovanna Ralli: Bruna
Roberto Risso: Carlo Conti 
Sergio Raimondi: Fernando 
Franca Valeri: Carla, capoturno
Peppino De Filippo: Dellisanti 
Marisa Merlini: Vera Colasanti
Giulia Rubini: Gabriella
Aldo Giuffrè: Guido Colasanti
Turi Pandolfini:  Cavaliere 
Tina Pica: Zia Vittoria
Ferruccio Amendola:  fratello di Bruna
Enzo Garinei: corteggiatore di Bruna
Miranda Campa: madre di Carlo Conti
Maria Zanoli: Clementina
Nando Bruno: l'utente irascibile

References

External links

1955 films
1955 romantic comedy films
Films directed by Gianni Franciolini
Films set in Rome
Films shot in Rome
Films with screenplays by Age & Scarpelli
Italian romantic comedy-drama films
1950s romantic comedy-drama films
Italian black-and-white films
1950s Italian films